Recipes from the Garden of Contentment is a work on cooking and gastronomy written by the Qing-dynasty painter and poet Yuan Mei. It is known in English under various titles, including Food Lists of the Garden of Contentment, Menus from the Garden of Contentment, Recipes from Sui Garden and The Way of Eating. It was originally published in 1792 (the 57th year of Qianlong Emperor), and contains instructions and critiques on Chinese cuisine as well as a large number of recipes of dishes from the period. It was updated by Xia Chuanzheng in the late 19th century, and not translated into English in complete form until 2018.

Content
The work reflects Yuan's "orthodox" literati stance on Chinese cuisine, which derided the opulent displays and dishes in banquets of his time. Yuan also resented what he regarded as the corruption of Chinese food by Manchu cooks. The work contains a preface, two chapters on gastronomy, and 12 chapters on recipes using various ingredients:
"Preface"
"Essential Knowledge": 20 sections
"Things to Avoid": 14 sections
"Seafood": 9 sections
"River Delicacies": 9 sections
"Sacrificial Animal" [pork]: 43 sections
"Various Animals"': 16 sections
"Poultry": 56 sections
"Scaled Fish": 17 sections
"Scaleless Fish": 28 sections
"Various Vegetable Dishes": 47 sections
"Small Dishes": 41 sections
"Appetizers and Dim Sum": 55 sections
"Rice and Congee": 2 sections
"Tea and Wine": 16 sections

Foods and theory
A wide variety of foods and recipes are presented in the Recipes from the Garden of Contentment that show the gustatory preferences of Yuan Mei and people during the mid-18th century. For instance, a particular recipe to imitate roe-filled mitten crabs, shows that the demand and intense fondness for crab and crab-roe in Chinese cuisine goes back several centuries, and that people have also actively attempted to find a substitute for it when it is unavailable:

Annotated manuscript
More than half a century after the publication of the Recipes from the Garden of Contentment, Xia Chuanzheng (1843–1883) annotated and expanded the contents of the original work and published it as the Recipes from the Garden of Contentment, Extended and Rectified. The modified work contains two additional chapters:
"Sweeteners and colourants"
"Condiments"
The original text was also thoroughly annotated with reference to Chinese historical and philosophical works, and listed therapeutic effects of the food based on traditional Chinese medicine. Correction to errors in Recipes from the Garden of Contentment were also provided by Xia along with sometimes humorous anecdotes about the foods.

Bilingual translation
A bilingual Chinese and English version was published in 2018 as Recipes from the Garden of Contentment, translated by Sean J. S. Chen. It is 428 pages in this hardback edition, with extensive annotations, illustrations, and a glossary.  In 2019, it was republished in trade-paperback form as The Way of Eating.  The book was developed from the author's online translation project, Way of the Eating, developed from 2013 through 2017.

References

Further reading

External links

  English translation with original Chinese, in website form with commentaries.
  The revised edition, in the original Chinese (no English translation).

1792 non-fiction books
Chinese cookbooks
Chinese cuisine